The 1976 British Formula Three season was the 26th season of the British Formula Three season. Rupert Keegan took the B.A.R.C. BP Super Visco British Formula 3 Championship, while Bruno Giacomelli took the B.R.D.C. Shellsport British Formula Three Championship.

Thanks to Giacomelli's March 763-Toyota and to Keegan's old 743, March dominated the two championships with 12 race wins, the other five falling to the Chevron B34s of Geoff Lees and mid-season convert Keegan.

B.A.R.C. BP Super Visco British F3 Championship
Champion:  Rupert Keegan

Joint Runner Up:  Bruno Giacomelli

Results

Drivers' Championship

Table

B.R.D.C. Shellsport British F3 Championship
Champion:  Bruno Giacomelli

Joint Runner Up:  Rupert Keegan

Results

Table

Non-Championship Races

Results

References

British Formula Three Championship seasons
Formula Three